Tumut Shire was a local government area in the South West Slopes region of New South Wales, Australia.

Tumut Shire was established in 1928 by the amalgamation of the Municipality of Tumut with the surrounding Gadara Shire.

On 12 May 2016, the Tumut Shire merged with the Tumbarumba Shire to form the Snowy Valleys Council.

The last mayor of Tumut Shire was Cr. Sue Bulger, an independent politician.

Towns and localities
The former Shire included the town of Tumut and the small towns of Gilmore, Adelong, Grahamstown, Gocup, Brungle, Talbingo, Wondalga, Batlow, Killimicat and Cabramurra.

Council

Current composition and election method
Prior to its dissolution, the Tumut Shire Council was composed of seven councillors elected proportionally as one entire ward. All councillors are elected for a fixed four-year term of office. The mayor was elected by the councillors at the first meeting of the council. The most recent election was held on 8 September 2012, and the makeup of the former council was as follows:

The last Council, elected in 2012 and dissolved in 2016, in order of election, was:

References

Local government areas of the Riverina
Former local government areas of New South Wales
2016 disestablishments in Australia